Heroy Clarke is a Jamaican politician from the Labour Party.

References 

Living people
People from Saint James Parish, Jamaica
21st-century Jamaican politicians
Members of the House of Representatives of Jamaica
Jamaica Labour Party politicians
Year of birth missing (living people)
Members of the 13th Parliament of Jamaica
Members of the 14th Parliament of Jamaica